RK Launcher is a free application intended to generate a dock on the side of a Windows computer screen. The application has support for themes and can support docklets made for ObjectDock and Y'z Dock. Icons with the file extension .PNG and .ICO can be placed on the dock for shortcuts to applications and documents. The application also mimics the smooth zooming and scrolling effects of the Mac OS X smooth zooming animations, as well as the effects used when minimizing windows (Aladdin's Lamp Effect).

See also
 Dock (computing)
 RocketDock
 ObjectDock
 Xwindows dock
 Avant Window Navigator
 Y'z Dock
 MobyDock

References
  Anke Anlauf (January 14, 2010), Schmucke PC-Docks wie auf dem Mac , Softonic OnSoftware

External links
 www.thewindowsclub.com/rk-launcher-for-windows 
Application launchers
Windows-only freeware